Phyllis I. Gardner (born July 7, 1950) is a Professor of Medicine at the Stanford University School of Medicine. She has previously served as Dean of Education. Gardner was one of the first people to be publicly skeptical of Elizabeth Holmes, the founder of blood testing company Theranos, who was later found guilty of investor fraud.

Early life and education 
Gardner completed her bachelor's degree at the University of Illinois, where she specialized in biology. She studied at Harvard Medical School and graduated in 1976. She has held a license to practice medicine in California since 1979. She completed research fellowships at Columbia University and University College London. She was a postdoctoral fellow at University College London in 1982. Gardner trained in internal medicine at the Massachusetts General Hospital. She was a Chief Resident at the Stanford School of Medicine. In 2002 Gardner argued against a merger of University College London and Imperial College London.

Research and career 
Gardner joined Stanford University in 1984. Gardner works on cardiac arrhythmias and cystic fibrosis pathogenesis. In 1998 Gardner was appointed Senior Associate Dean for Education and Student Affairs at Stanford University. She is a Professor of Clinical Pharmacology. She led a laboratory that focused on ion channel biophysics.

Entrepreneurship 
After spending ten years in academia, Gardner became interested in research and development and entrepreneurship. She developed several forms of slow released medication, including an adaptation for retention in the stomach. Gardner has been involved with several start-ups in the biotechnology and pharmaceutical industries. From 1996 to 1998 Gardner served as Vice President of Research and Head of the Technology Institute at the Alza Corporation. Gardner served as Director of the biopharmaceutical company Revance Therapeutics from 2007 to 2018. She is an adjunct partner at Essex Woodlands  Health Ventures. She founded several companies, including the Genomics Collaborative, SKOLAR and the CambriaTech Holding Co. She was appointed to the Board Of Directors of Ventaira Pharmaceuticals in 2006. Gardner serves on the Board of Fellows of the Harvard Medical School. She was appointed to the Board of Directors of CohBar, a clinical stage biotechnology company, in 2019.

In 2002, Elizabeth Holmes visited Gardner at Stanford University. Holmes proposed her idea for a microfluidic device that could detect and treat infectious diseases. Gardner was critical of the proposal, explaining that it is not possible to use antibiotics on such a small scale. Holmes dropped out of Stanford a few months later, but Gardner followed the evolution of Theranos.  Very briefly, both served on the Harvard Medical School Board of Fellows after Holmes was given an invitation to join.  Gardner did not permit Holmes to visit the Stanford campus and called for her to be sent to prison.

Selected publications

In popular culture 
Dr. Gardner was portrayed by Emmy Award-winning actress Laurie Metcalf in the Hulu series The Dropout about the rise and fall of former Theranos CEO Elizabeth Holmes.

References 

1950 births
Living people
American physicians
Harvard Medical School alumni
Massachusetts General Hospital people
Stanford University faculty
University of Illinois Chicago alumni
20th-century American women physicians
20th-century American physicians
21st-century American women physicians
21st-century American physicians